Terbium(III) oxide, also known as terbium sesquioxide, is a sesquioxide of the rare earth metal terbium, having chemical formula . It is a p-type semiconductor, which conducts protons, which is enhanced when doped with calcium.

It is a basic oxide and easily dissolved to dilute acids, and then almost colourless terbium salt is formed.
 Tb2O3 + 6 H+ → 2 Tb3+ + 3 H2O

The crystal structure is cubic and the lattice constant is a = 1057 pm.

References

Terbium compounds
Sesquioxides
Semiconductor materials